Huw Richard Forbes Jones (born 17 December 1993) is a Scottish international rugby union player who plays as a centre, although he can also play as a full-back or winger. He is in his second spell playing for Glasgow Warriors, having spent the 2021-22 season playing in England for Harlequins.

Background
Jones was born in Leith in Edinburgh in the Eastern General Hospital to parents Bill and Hillary. At the time of Jones' birth, his father coached at George Watson's College where Scott Hastings was among those he coached. His parents had previously studied at Edinburgh University. Jones' maternal grandfather is also Scottish. His father has Welsh heritage reflected in the name, Huw Jones.

When he was two years old his family moved from Musselburgh to Kent. Jones was later schooled at Millfield in Somerset.

Club career

False Bay and UCT Ikey Tigers
After finishing his schooling, Jones moved to South Africa for his gap year where he worked at Bishops Preparatory School in Cape Town. He played club rugby for False Bay in 2013 and after the club's Director of Rugby, Kevin Musikanth, was appointed as head coach of the  Varsity Cup side, Jones followed Musikanth by enrolling at the University of Cape Town for 2014. He made a total of nine appearances for UCT during the 2014 Varsity Cup competition, scoring a try in their match against  as UCT finished second in the pool stage. After beating Western Cape rivals  in the semi-finals, the  won the final against  in Potchefstroom. Jones opened the scoring for the visitors by scoring a try in the fourth minute and helped them clinch the title in dramatic fashion as they fought back from 33 to 15 down with five minutes to go to achieve a 39–33 victory to win the competition for the second time.

Western Province/Stormers
On the back of his performances for the  during the 2014 Varsity Cup, Jones was called up to the Vodacom Cup side of local provincial team, . He took just eleven minutes to score his first try at senior level, setting Western Province on their way to a 28–15 victory.

In the latter half of 2014, he appeared for the  side in the 2014 Under-21 Provincial Championship, making three starts and scoring two tries in their match against the  team in Durban.

In 2015, Jones was included in the  wider training group prior to the 2015 Super Rugby season. He also came off the bench in the next five matches, playing less than ten minutes on each occasion. In the 64th minute, Jones scored his first Super Rugby try, but it was not enough as the home side won 25–20.

The final two of these appearances occurred in the play-offs after Western Province finished third on the log during the regular season; a last-minute substitute appearance in their 23–18 victory over the Blue Bulls in their semi-final match was followed by another appearance off the bench in the final, which the  won 32–24 in Johannesburg.

Jones was involved in the Stormers' 2016 Super Rugby season, making six appearances off the bench prior to the international break, during which time he earned his first international call-up for Scotland.

On 28 October 2017 Jones scored two tries in a Man of the Match farewell performance as  beat the Natal Sharks in the final to win the 2017 Currie Cup.

Glasgow Warriors
Jones has stated that he always felt Scottish. He has kept a saltire above his bed since he was 11. When Jones started playing for the University of Cape Town he insisted on being referred to as Scottish. A saltire next to his name caught the attention of  Gavin Vaughan of Glasgow Warriors when he was watching a televised game from  South Africa in which Jones was playing. According to some sources it seems it was a Wikipedia  that allowed Gavin Vaughan to see that Huw Jones was Scottish.

In February 2017, it was announced that the 2017 Super Rugby season would be Jones' last for the Stormers before he returned to Scotland. He joined Warriors 10 months later midway through the 2017-18 after the Currie Cup Final in South Africa.

Jones was drafted to Currie in the Scottish Premiership for the 2018–19 season.

On 25 December 2017, Glasgow Warriors announced that Jones had signed a contract until at least 2021. Jones cited the world class coaching as one of the reasons behind his decision.

Harlequins
On 26 February 2021, it was confirmed that Jones would leave Glasgow to travel to France to sign for Top 14 side Bayonne ahead of the 2021–22 season. However the move to Bayonne fell through when the French club were relegated to Rugby Pro D2. He signed for English side Harlequins in the Premiership Rugby for the 2021-22 season.

International career
In May 2016, Jones was called up to the Scotland squad and made his Test debut during their 2016 summer tour of Japan. In November 2016 he played his first home match for Scotland against Australia, scoring two tries in the narrow defeat.

In February 2017, he was named in Scotland's squad for the 2017 Six Nations Championship, starting their first two games against Ireland and France.

During the 2017 Autumn Internationals, Jones scored tries in all three matches, against Samoa, the All Blacks and Australia.

Jones played all 5 of Scotland matches in the 2018 Six Nations Championship, scoring 2 tries in Scotland's Calcutta Cup victory over England.

Jones played in the opening 3 matches of the 2019 Six Nations Championship but was injured in Scotland's loss to Ireland and was ruled out for the remainder of the tournament.

After being omitted from Scotland's 2019 Rugby World Cup squad, Jones was recalled for the 2020 Six Nations Championship.

International tries

References

External links

1993 births
Living people
Scottish rugby union players
Rugby union players from Edinburgh
Rugby union centres
Rugby union fullbacks
Stormers players
Western Province (rugby union) players
People educated at Millfield
Currie RFC players
Glasgow Warriors players
Scotland international rugby union players
Harlequin F.C. players
British expatriate sportspeople in South Africa
Scottish people of Welsh descent
Anglo-Scots
Rugby union players from Kent
University of Cape Town alumni